The 1867 Maryland gubernatorial election took place on November 5, 1867. Incumbent Governor Thomas Swann did not run for re-election.

Democratic Party candidate Oden Bowie defeated Republican candidate Hugh Lennox Bond.

Bowie took his oath of office on January 8, 1868, but by a provision of the 1867 State Constitution, he did not actually become Governor until January 13, 1869.

Results

Notes

References

Gubernatorial
1867
Maryland